Alta Via 1 is a 150-kilometre-long high-level public footpath which runs through the eastern Dolomites in Italy. It is also known as the Dolomite High Route 1. It passes through some of the finest scenery in the Dolomites. The path runs south from Pragser Wildsee, near Toblach, to Belluno. Prags can be accessed by bus, and Belluno has both train and bus services. 

This is the classic high route in the Dolomites, and also the easiest. It gets slightly more difficult as it goes south, but the only section which might present difficulties is the descent from Schiara, and this can be bypassed. About 7–12 days are required to complete the full route. A typical day on the route might involve about seven hours walking, with ascents and descents of about 1000 metres. It can be attempted during the period mid june to october (refuges usually are closed in mis September), when the route should be largely free of snow. The route is signposted by dark blue triangles with an inset number one.

Maps of the route 

The following maps cover the route.

Casa Editrice Tabacco Maps (North to South)
 map number 31 Prags Braies
 map number 3 Cortina and Ampezzano
 map number 15 Pelmo Civetta
 map number 25 Zoldo Agordo area
 map number 24 Dolomites Belluno - Nevegal
other useful Tabacco maps
 map number 1 Cortina - Sexten
 map number 4 Agordo - Zoldo - Pale di S. Martino

Kompass Wanderkarten Maps
 map number 55 Cortina d' Ampezzo
 map number 57 Bruneck Toblach Prags
 map number 77 Alpi Bellunesi

Kompass and Tabacco maps are readily available in the Dolomites.

Walking the path 

Camping is forbidden along the route, but there is ample accommodation available in mountain refuges and in valley hotels. There are refuges all along the route. During August advance booking is essential. 

The Alta Via 1 passes by several Via Ferrata, but none are incorporated in the route, and no special climbing equipment is required.

The highest point on the route is Monte Lagazuoi at 2,750 metres. There is a large refuge on Monte Lagazuoi which has a restaurant and accommodation for 69 people. The route from Monte Lagazuoi descends to Falzarego Pass and then continues south. There is a cable car from the Refugio Lagazuoi to the Falzarego Pass, but a better way to descend would be through the Via Ferrata Lagazuoi Tunnels. This is a World War I tunnel which runs down through the mountain. It is also possible to descend via the Kaiserjaeger Trail and the Martini Ledge. This route passes a number of relics of the fighting that took place here during World War I. The area around Monte Lagazuoi and 5 Torri is a World War I open-air museum.

There are a number of other high-level routes in the Dolomites, including the Alta Via 2, which runs from Brixen to Feltre.

See also
 Dolomites
 Via Ferrata

Photographs

References

External links
 Tabacco Hiking Maps from Omnimap
 "Alta via 1" Refuges Map
 Rifugio Biella, one of the hut in the "Alta via 1"
 Dolomiti.org
 High Ways of the Dolomites
Guide to high level routes in the Dolomites
The Dolomites "Alta Via" n.1, 2200 pics, maps and description 
Monte Lagazuoi & via ferrata Lagazuoi Tunnels
Alta Via no. 1 : in dutch description of this trek
Organized Trailrunning and Trekking Tours on the Alta Via 1
Altavia of the Dolomites n.1 on OpenStreetMap

Hiking trails in Italy
Dolomites